Lucius Caecilius Metellus Delmaticus (born ) was a Roman politician and general. He was a son of Lucius Caecilius Metellus Calvus and brother of Quintus Caecilius Metellus Numidicus. He was consul in 119 BC; during his year, he opposed Gaius Marius' election procedures law. As consul and proconsul from 119–117 BC, he campaigned against the Dalmatians. For his victories, he triumphed in 117 BC, earning his cognomen and dedicating two temples – also contributing to repairs for the Temple of Castor and Pollux – from the spoils of war.

He was probably elected censor in 115 BC; attribution of which Caecilius Metellus was elected censor in that year is disputed: Broughton's Magistrates of the Roman Republic (1951) believes it was Lucius Caecilius Metellus Diadematus; Ernst Badian, however, believes that the engraver made a mistake and that it is more likely that Delmaticus served as censor in that year.

He was later elected pontifex maximus, in place of Publius Mucius Scaevola, some time before December 114 BC. During his pontifical tenure, he was judge in a trial of three Vestal Virgins for unchastity, of which one was convicted. The acquittal by the pontiffs of two of the vestals was overturned the next year when they were convicted and put to death by a special tribunal convened under Lucius Cassius Longinus Ravilla.

His replacement as pontifex maximus was elected in 103 BC, indicating that Delmaticus likely had died by that time.

Children
He was the father of: 
 Lucius Caecilius Metellus
 Marcus Caecilius Metellus
 Caecilia Metella, wife of Marcus Aemilius Scaurus and later Sulla.

See also
 Caecilia gens

References

Sources

 
 

2nd-century BC births
2nd-century BC clergy
2nd-century BC Roman consuls
Delmaticus, Lucius
Optimates
Pontifices maximi of the Roman Republic
Roman censors
Year of birth uncertain
Year of death unknown